Murat İbrahim Uslu (born 17 July 1978) is a Turkish former professional footballer.

References

1978 births
Living people
Turkish footballers
Gaskispor footballers
Gaziantep F.K. footballers
Gaziantepspor footballers
Hatayspor footballers
Kardemir Karabükspor footballers
Mersin İdman Yurdu footballers
Bucaspor footballers
Çankırı Belediyespor footballers
Adıyamanspor footballers
Süper Lig players
People from Gülşehir
Association football goalkeepers